Fredericia Idrætscenter is an indoor sports arena in Fredericia, Denmark, used for several sports, including handball. The arena can hold 2,225 spectators (app. 850 seated) and is home to Fredericia HK.

External links
 Fredericia Idrætscenter 

Handball venues in Denmark
Indoor arenas in Denmark
Buildings and structures in Fredericia Municipality
Sports venues in the Region of Southern Denmark
Fredericia